The women's 4 × 100 metres relay event at the 2010 Asian Games was held at the Aoti Main Stadium, Guangzhou, China on 23–26 November.

Schedule
All times are China Standard Time (UTC+08:00)

Records

Results 
Legend
DNF — Did not finish

Round 1
 Qualification: First 3 in each heat (Q) and the next 2 fastest (q) advance to the final.

Heat 1

Heat 2

Final

References
Results

Athletics at the 2010 Asian Games
2010